This is a list of flags used in Haiti. For more information about the national flag, visit the article Flag of Haiti.

National flag

Civil flags

Military flags

References

External links

 The Armorial of Haiti: Symbols of Nobility in the Reign of Henry Christophe
 République d'Haïti

Flags
Lists and galleries of flags
Flags